"The Thin Ice" is a song by Pink Floyd, released on The Wall in 1979.

Composition
The song, which is two minutes and 30 seconds in length, begins with the sound of an infant crying. The main body of the song is a 50s progression, with time signature in 6/8, commonly heard in doo-wop songs such as "Stand by Me", progressing from C Major to A minor, then F Major to G Major, played softly on piano and synthesiser. The first half of the lyrics are sung by David Gilmour in a gentle tone, beginning with "Mama loves her baby", and a refrain of "Ooh babe, ooh, baby blue". A bass guitar creates a dissonant effect mid-song, when it plays an F♯ against an A minor, the major sixth of the chord, and the augmented fourth of the key. Then Roger Waters takes over the lead vocal. The piano becomes staccato, as the lyric takes on a warning tone, with Waters singing "If you should go skating/On the thin ice of modern life...."

As the lyrics end, the diatonic sense of C Major is abandoned, as the melody heard earlier (E, D, F, E, and A) becomes stripped to a simple power chord riff, played loud by distorted guitars, with brief soloing. The song ends on a sustained C Major chord, but through crossfading with the next song on the album, "Another Brick in the Wall, Part 1", a D minor chord is interpolated, contributing to uneasiness intimated by the lyrics.

Plot
The Wall is the story of Pink, who grows up to become an alienated and embittered rock star, with a failing marriage and feelings of megalomania. "The Thin Ice" can be seen as the introduction to his story, since the previous song, the album's opening track "In The Flesh?" is chronologically placed later in the album's narrative, and then the story is begun via flashback. "The Thin Ice" introduces Pink as a baby and young child, and while the lyrics assure the listener that "Mama loves her baby, and Daddy loves you, too", it warns that "[T]he sea may look warm... the sky may look blue", but "Don't be surprised when a crack in the ice/Appears under your feet".

Film version
The film shows hundreds of soldiers in the war, either wounded or dead, then cuts to Pink floating in his hotel pool. As shown later in the film (in the segment for "One of My Turns"), Pink has cut his hand, and the amount of blood in the water is exaggerated, until he appears to be floating in a pool of blood.

The film version has an extended piano intro that plays before Gilmour's vocal.

Personnel
David Gilmour – vocals (first verse), guitars, Prophet-5 synthesiser
Nick Mason – drums
Roger Waters – vocals (second verse), bass guitar
Richard Wright – piano, Hammond organ

Personnel per Fitch and Mahon.

References
Fitch, Vernon. The Pink Floyd Encyclopedia (3rd edition), 2005. .

Notes

External links

Pink Floyd songs
1979 songs
Hard rock ballads
Songs written by Roger Waters
Song recordings produced by Bob Ezrin
Song recordings produced by David Gilmour
Song recordings produced by Roger Waters